The Wave Tag Team Championship is a professional wrestling tag team championship owned by the Pro Wrestling Wave promotion. The title is nicknamed "Dual Shock Wave". The championship was first announced on August 28, 2011, at Wave's fourth anniversary event, and the first champions were crowned on October 30, when kanAyu (Ayumi Kurihara and Kana) defeated Uematsu☆Ran (Ran Yu-Yu and Toshie Uematsu) to win the Dual Shock Wave 2011 tournament and become the inaugural champions. From 2009 to 2010, Wave had promoted matches for the TLW World Young Women's Tag Team Championship, but this was the first title officially created and owned by the promotion. Though primarily contested for by female wrestlers, one male team, Yankii Nichokenju (Isami Kodaka and Yuko Miyamoto), has also held the title.

Like most professional wrestling championships, the title is won as a result of a scripted match. There have been thirty-one reigns shared among twenty-six teams consisting of thirty-six different wrestlers. Ikuto Hidaka and Itsuki Aoki are the current champions in their second reign as a team, while it's the second individually for Aoki.

Reigns 
kanAyu (Ayumi Kurihara and Kana) were the first champions in the title's history. Las Aventureras' (Ayako Hamada and Yuu Yamagata) third reign holds the record for the longest reign in the title's history at 282 days, while Yoko Hatanaka's (Gami and Tomoka Nakagawa) second reign holds the record for the shortest reign at 10 days. Shidarezakura's (Hikaru Shida and Yumi Ohka) only reign holds the record for the shortest reign, at 31 days. Las Aventureras holds the record for most reigns as a team, with three, while Ayako Hamada, Misaki Ohata, Tomoka Nakagawa and Yuu Yamagata share the record for most reigns individually, with three each.

Title history

Combined reigns 

By team

By wrestler

See also 
 Goddess of Stardom Championship
 International Ribbon Tag Team Championship
 JWP Openweight Championship
 Oz Academy Tag Team Championship
Women's World Tag Team Championship

References

External links 
 Pro Wrestling Wave's official website

Pro Wrestling Wave championships
Women's professional wrestling tag team championships